Sergio Riva (born March 29, 1983) is an Italian bobsledder who has competed since 2007. He finished 17th in the two-man event at the 2010 Winter Olympics in Vancouver.

Riva competed at the FIBT World Championships 2009 in Lake Placid, New York in the four-man event, but did not start the third run. His best World Cup finish was first in a two-man event at Lake Placid, New York in December 2010.

References

1983 births
Bobsledders at the 2010 Winter Olympics
Italian male bobsledders
Living people
Olympic bobsledders of Italy
Bobsledders of Centro Sportivo Carabinieri